Etoumbi is a town in the Cuvette-Ouest province of northwestern Republic of the Congo.  Most of its residents make their living hunting in the local forest.

Etoumbi has been the site of four recent outbreaks of the Ebola virus, believed to have sparked by local villagers eating the flesh of animals that are found dead in the forest.  In 2003, 120 people died in an outbreak.  An outbreak in May 2005 led to the quarantine of the town.

References

External links

  Congo's Ebola town is sealed off, BBC, May 20, 2005
 8 dead with Ebola-like symptoms in Congo, CNN, May 12, 2005
 Multimap: Map of Etoumbi

Populated places in the Republic of the Congo